Ruxandra Donose (born 2 September 1964, in Bucharest) is a Romanian operatic mezzo-soprano.

Donose studied singing with Georgeta Stoleriu at the Ciprian Porumbescu Conservatory, where she graduated in 1989.

In 1990 she was the runner up at the ARD International Music Competition. After this, she had her first engagement abroad, in Basel. In 1992 she became a member of the Vienna State Opera. From there, she developed a fast-paced international career, as an opera singer (Covent Garden, Opéra Bastille, Metropolitan Opera, Salzburg Festival etc.) and also as an interpreter for Lied and oratorio.

Donose is considered a distinguished bel canto singer, but also one of the leading interpreters of the French and the Mozartian mezzo-soprano repertoire. Her voice is "marked by a dark, warm tone, extreme mobility and light, shining heights".

About her live recording with Rossini's La cenerentola, in the title role, at Glyndebourne festival 2005, Barry Brenesal notes:
"However, I will single out only Ruxandra Donose for praise. Hers is a dusky mezzo, even in coloration, volume, and support across the registers. The voice is able to handle exacting coloratura without any aspiration or evidence of strain. Her forthright, focused attack in her final aria ("Non più mesta") brought memories of Marilyn Horne in the 1970s; and like Horne, Donose builds her part from the text, not by working around it." (from Fanfare Magazine)

Donose lives with her husband and two children in Vienna. She is currently working on her doctorate thesis.

Discography 

2008:Rossini: La Cenerentola / Jurowski, Donose, Glyndebourne Festival [Blu-ray, Label: Opus Arte
2007:Ruxandra Donose: The Songs of Nicolae Bretan, Vol. I, MP3 Album

References

External links 

Ruxandra Donose (Mezzo-soprano) on Bach Cantatas Website
Ruxandra Donose at Royal Opera House
Ruxandra Donose at Bolshoi Theatre
Cheryl North interview with Ruxandra Donose
Ruxandra Donose at Intermusica.co.uk
La Cenerentola by Rossini, live recording with Donose at Glyndebourne, 2005

1964 births
Living people
Musicians from Bucharest
Romanian operatic mezzo-sopranos
Romanian expatriates in Austria
National University of Music Bucharest alumni
20th-century Romanian women opera singers
21st-century Romanian women opera singers

Prize-winners of the ARD International Music Competition